This is a list of transfers in Serbian football for the 2010–11 winter transfer window.
Only moves featuring a Serbian Superliga side are listed.
The order by which the clubs are listed is equal to the classification of the SuperLiga at the winter break.

Serbian SuperLiga

Partizan Belgrade

In:

Out:

Red Star Belgrade

In:

Out:

FK Vojvodina

In:

Out:

Rad Beograd

In:

Out:

Sloboda Sevojno

In:

Out:

Spartak ZV Subotica

In:

Out:

Javor Ivanjica

In:

Out:

FK Smederevo

In:

Out:

FK Jagodina

In:

Out:

OFK Beograd

In:

Out:

BSK Borča

In:

Out:

FK Inđija

In:

Out:

Borac Čačak

In:

Out:

Metalac G.M.

In:

Out:

Hajduk Kula

In:

Out:

Čukarički Stankom

In:

Out:

See also
Serbian SuperLiga
2010–11 Serbian SuperLiga
List of Serbian football transfers summer 2010

References
 sportske.net information agency.
 SuperLiga news at Sportski žurnal website.
 Second half season squads at Sportski žurnal website.
 Transfers at MojSport.

2010–11
Serbian SuperLiga
transfers